Tilbury District High School is a high school located in Tilbury, Ontario. It is part of the Lambton Kent District School Board.

History 
The school was built in the 1940s. It was expanded in stages throughout the 1960s.

A reduced speed limit zone near the school was proposed in 2020.

The school has had several cases of COVID-19 during the COVID-19 pandemic in Canada.
If a provincial moratorium on rural school closures is removed, Tilbury District High School and other schools in the area may close.

See also
List of high schools in Ontario

References

External links
 

High schools in Chatham-Kent
Educational institutions established in 1954
1954 establishments in Ontario